Alagonia was a town of ancient Laconia, ancient Greece, near the Messenian frontier, belonging to the Eleuthero-Lacones, containing temples of the Greek gods Dionysus and Artemis. This town was 30 stadia distant from Gerenia.

Its site is tentatively located near the modern Anatoliko.

References

Populated places in ancient Laconia
Former populated places in Greece
Children of Zeus